This is a list of full generals in the Royal Marines. The rank of general (or full general to distinguish it from the lower general officer ranks) is the highest rank currently achievable by serving officers in the Royal Marines although no dedicated Royal Marines full general posts currently exist, unless they serve in tri-service positions. From the post's inception in 1943 up until 1977 the professional head of the Royal Marines, the Commandant General, held the rank of full general but since that time he has been of lower general officer rank. The rank of general is immediately superior to lieutenant-general.

See also
 List of British Army full generals
 List of Royal Navy admirals
 List of Royal Air Force air chief marshals

References

Generals
British generals
 *